= GNC Live Well 200 =

There have been two NASCAR races named the GNC Live Well 200:

- GNC Live Well 200 (Milwaukee), a Craftsman Truck Series race run at the Milwaukee Mile from 2001 to 2002
- GNC Live Well 200 (Watkins Glen), a Busch Series race run at Watkins Glen International in 2001
